Stone Country: Country Artists Perform the Songs of the Rolling Stones is a 1997 tribute album to the English rock band The Rolling Stones. It was released in September 1997 via Beyond Music. The album includes eleven country music artists performing renditions of the band's songs.

Content
The Tractors' rendition of "The Last Time" was the project's first single release. It charted at number 75 on Hot Country Songs dated for the week ending October 4, 1997. The project took nearly 18 months to complete.

Critical reception
Jon Johnson of Country Standard Time gave the project a mixed review, criticizing the project for focusing entirely on singles, and saying that the arrangements "add absolutely nothing to the originals", while praising the vocal performances of George Jones and Nanci Griffith, along with the musical arrangement of Blackhawk's cover of "Wild Horses". Stephen Thomas Erlewine of AllMusic rated the project 3 out of 5 stars, finding the arrangements "slick" while praising the vocal performances of Travis Tritt, Blackhawk, and Nanci Griffith.

Track listing

Charts

References

Country albums by American artists
The Rolling Stones tribute albums
Country music compilation albums
1997 compilation albums
Country rock compilation albums
Rock compilation albums